Scalise is a surname. Notable people with the surname include:

Frank Scalice (1893–1957), American mobster
George Scalise, American labor leader
John Scalise (1900–1929), American mobster
Joseph Scalise (born 1937), American mobster
Lawrence F. Scalise (1933–2015), Iowa Attorney General
Manuel Scalise (born 1981), Italian footballer
Raffaele Scalise (born 1950), Italian mobster
Steve Scalise (born 1965), United States Congressional Representative from Louisiana